Maria Cumani Quasimodo (20 May 1908 - 22 November 1995) was an Italian actress and dancer.
 
Born Maria Cumani in Milan, she studied dance under Jia Ruskaja. In 1936, she became the companion of the poet Salvatore Quasimodo, with whom she had a son, Alessandro. In 1937, she made her professional debut as a dancer, and shortly later she specialized in "poetic dance", a personal style in which dance was combined with poetic verses. She was married to Quasimodo from 1948 to 1960. In the meanwhile, Cumani Quasimodo started a double career as a choreographer and a stage and film character actress. Shortly before her death, she released an autobiography, L'arte del silenzio, which particularly focuses on her years alongside Salvatore Quasimodo.

Filmography

References

External links   
 

1908 births
1995 deaths
Actresses from Milan
Italian film actresses 
20th-century Italian actresses
Italian stage actresses
Italian ballerinas
Dancers from Milan